Norodom Narindrapong (18 September 1954 – 7 October 2003) was a Prince of Cambodia. He was born in Phnom Penh to King Father Norodom Sihanouk and Queen Mother Norodom Monineath Sihanouk. The prince studied philosophy, criminology, and law at the Moscow State University, and spoke fluent French and Russian. Prince Narindrapong died in his Paris apartment from a heart attack on 7 October 2003 at the age of 49. He was married and had two daughters:

Princess Norodom Simonarine (born August 1984)
Princess Norodom Moninouk (born March 1987)

He was the younger full brother of King Norodom Sihamoni and half-brother to 12 other siblings.

References

1954 births
2003 deaths
Cambodian princes
Cambodian expatriates in France 
Moscow State University alumni
People from Phnom Penh
House of Norodom
Cambodian people of Corsican descent
Cambodian people of French descent
Cambodian people of Italian descent 
Children of prime ministers of Cambodia
Sons of kings